is a Japanese professional footballer who plays as a defender for  club Gamba Osaka.

Club career
Handa started his career with Montedio Yamagata Youth and was given his first professional contract for Montedio Yamagata in March 2019. He made his first-team debut in May 2019, coming on as a late substitute for Kai Miki in a J2 League game against JEF United Chiba. In July of the same year, he made his first start for the club in the second round of the Emperor's Cup in a 2–1 defeat to Tochigi SC. Handa went on to play six times in his debut season.

In the 2020 season, Handa played 15 times for Montedio Yamagata but 2021 was his breakthrough year – playing in 37 games and being in the starting XI on 36 occasions. He also scored his first goal for the club in a 3–1 defeat to V-Varen Nagasaki and went on to score three goals during the rest of the season. In the 2022 season, Handa was again a key member of the starting XI, playing more than 3000 minutes over 37 games. He made a total of 95 appearances in four seasons with Yamagata.

In January 2023, Handa signed for J1 League club Gamba Osaka.

International career
In March 2023, Handa was called up to the Japan national team for the first time by manager Hajime Moriyasu to play in the 2023 Kirin Challenge Cup.

Career statistics

Club

References

External links

2002 births
Living people
Japanese footballers
Association football defenders
Montedio Yamagata players
Gamba Osaka players
J1 League players
J2 League players